Weiser National Forest in Idaho was established as the Weiser Forest Reserve by the U.S. Forest Service on May 25, 1905 with .  It became a National Forest on March 4, 1907. On April 1, 1944 the entire forest was combined with Idaho National Forest to re-establish Payette National Forest, and the name was discontinued.

References

External links
Forest History Society
Forest History Society:Listing of the National Forests of the United States Text from Davis, Richard C., ed. Encyclopedia of American Forest and Conservation History. New York: Macmillan Publishing Company for the Forest History Society, 1983. Vol. II, pp. 743-788.

Former National Forests of Idaho